The women's long jump event at the 1970 European Athletics Indoor Championships was held on 14 March in Vienna.

Results

References

Long jump at the European Athletics Indoor Championships
Long